Suphapburut Juthathep is Thai lakorn series consists of 5 dramas, Khun Chai Taratorn, Khun Chai Pawornruj, Khun Chai Puttipat, Khun Chai Rachanon and Khun Chai Ronapee. The televieion series based on the novel series of the same name and the series were made to celebrate ThaiTV3's 43rd anniversary.

The series was produced by 5 different companies, producers and directors. It was first aired on every Friday–Sunday, 20.15 to 22.45 (TST) since June 15 until July 7, 2013. Later, it was rerunned two times on March 6 – August 20, 2015 and on January 31 – July 14, 2017, respectively.

The series received the huge response, propelled the lead casts to the stardom and being popular, because the mostly of lead casts are the newcomer of television drama. In June 2013, it was reported the statistic that over a thousand parents, within a few months, named their children with the name of the characters.

In 2015, the publisher and the writers of Suphapburut Juthathep's novels, announced to publish its sequel called Duangjai Taewaprom. The sequels are the stories of the five Mom Rajawongse's children but having the Dewaprom's descendants as the main characters and using their names as the books' titles.

In 2020, It was confirmed by Channel 3 that they are going to make Duangjai Thewaprom as a series, produced by the same production company and producers with Suphapburut Juthathep, and was reported that they already started casting the main characters.

Plot 
The series are the love and relationship stories of five Juthathep half-brothers, who were born as Mom Rajawongse (M.R.), starting in 1957 year. Although, they were born from different mothers but they really love each other's and have a great relationship. After their parents die altogether when they were young, they were raised by the grandmothers, Mom Aiet, and Aiet's younger sister, Grandma Oon.

Their fathers, M.C. Witchakorn, had a promise with his best friend and lifesaver, M.R. Taewapan Taewaprom, in the past. That is he wanted an either of his sons marry to an either of Taewapan's daughters. As a result, five of them have a responsibility to keep the promise. But later, all of them want to choose their own partners, so it leads their grandmothers to force them to marriage.

Production 
Before filming the series, the male lead casts, Warintorn, Thanavat, Jirayu, Tanin and James, had to go through 9 missions for preparing to be M.R. The missions were made as a variety show called Channel 3 Superstars and aired on every Sunday, 14.30 (TST), started on November 4, 2012. The show aired total 12 episode, including 11 episodes of 9 missions and the final episode of the grand opening of the series.
The list of 12 episodes are :

For filming location, Channel 3 invest in building Juthathep palace with a budget of 10 million bahts, permanent located at Nong Khaem District, Bangkok and also able to film other sereies.

Broadcast order

Main characters

Juthathep family 

Family tree reference :

 M.R. Taratorn Juthathep / Khun Chai Taratorn — Warintorn Panhakarn
He is the oldest brother, the first son of M.C. Witchakorn and M.R. Ubolwan. His parents died since the five were young so he is responsible to take care of the younger brothers. He is warm-hearted, calm, sober and responsible person. He works as an archeologist at Fine Arts Department and also a historical teacher at the university.

 M.R. Pawornruj Juthathep / Khun Chai Pawornruj — Thanavat Vatthanaputi
He is the only son of M.C. Witchakorn and Mom Cheongnang, who used to be a servant. He is calm, polite, wise and good at negotiation but deeply in the bottom of his heart, he thinks that he is just the son of a servant, doesn't equal to his brothers. And that is the reason why Grandma Oon always nagged him a lot. He works as a diplomat, Second Secretary at Thai Embassy in Thailand and later moves to Switzerland.

 M.R., M.D. Puttipat Juthathep / Khun Chai Puttipat — Jirayu Tangsrisuk
The Neurosurgeon at the public hospital, the first son of M.C. Witchakorn with Mom Yok, a daughter of the Chinese magnate. He is calm, clever, quiet, scrupulous and has no interest about love. He is so popular for the patients and nurses at his workplace because of his good-look and smart body.

 M.R. Rachanon Juthathep / Khun Chai Rachanon / Kun Chai Lek — Tanin Manoonsilp
He is the forth son of M.C. Witchakorn but is the second son of him with Mom Yok, so he is a brother of the same blood with M.R. Puttipat. He is hilarious, love-freeom and socialized person, he usually goes to the party with M.R. Ronapee. Rachanon is close with Ronapee the most, among all of his brothers, because they have similar personality and their ages are close. He graduated from abroad and works as civil engineer.

 M.R., Flg.Off. Ronapee Juthathep / Khun Chai Ronapee — James Ma
The Royal Thai Air Force fighter pilot, is on duty at Wing 1, 13th Fighter Squadron of F-86F aircraft.
He is the last child of M.C. Witchakorn and M.R. Ubolwan, the youngest in five brothers. His personality is similar with M.R. Rachanon, the youngest's habit, love-freedom, wise and brave. He has loved an aircraft since young so he always wants to be a pilot.

 Mom Aiet Juthathep — 
She married Phra Ong Chao Wipawasu Juthathep, the origin of Juthathep. She has a younger sister, Grandma Oon, who hasn't married and moved to live with her at Juthathep palace. She and her husband has only child, M.C. Witchakorn, and has five grandsons. After her husband's death, her son and her in-laws died altogether because of an accident, she and Oon have to raised their grandsons by themself.

But before M.C. Witchakorn's death, he once made a promise with M.R. Taewapan Taewaprom, which would like either of the both's children are married because M.R. Taewapan used to save his life. So, she and Oon need to force their grandsons to keep the promise.

 Grandma Oon — 
She is the younger sister of Mom Aiet, later moved to live with her sister and help Aiet to raise the grandsons. She hasn't married because she had a bad experience about love and her fiancé in the past. Her fiancé broke the engagement and left her, for go to being with the servant, so she hates all every servants who become the wife of the royalty. As a result, she always nagged M.R. Pawornruj and loves him less than other grandsons. On the other hand, Oon loves M.R. Ronapee the most because his personality is like to be loved.

Taewaprom family 

 M.L. Kedsara Taewaprom — 
She is the oldest of three daughters of M.R. Taewapan Taewaprom. She is kind, prim, polite, truly noble-lady personality. She loves to baking Thai desserts and cooking, she is a tower of strength for her family, finding money for every expenses. She sells desserts as a job and do it all the time. As a result, it make her want to hang out and be independent like everyone else.

 M.L. Marathee Taewaprom — Chotika Wongwilas
She is a snobbery, self-centered and stubborn person. She desperately wanted to be Juthathep's in-law, because she was growing up with being told from her father that she would be Juthathep's in-law in the future. So she does everything for try to get an interest from M.R. Puttipat, also being nurse and works at the same hospital with him. She never helps paying family's expenses and uses her salary for herself.

 M.L. Wilairampa Taewaprom — 
She is the youngest child of M.R. Taewapan so she has the youngest's habits. She is close with M.L. Marathee and that make the both have similar personality. She is a college student and was raised by told that she would be Juthathep's in-law. That makes her try to make M.R. Ronapee love although it's a wrong method.

 M.L. Kratin Taewaprom — 
The only child of M.R. Worapan, the youngest brother of M.R. Taewapan, she was raised up in Southern Thailand because her father runs a rubber plantation. She is a native girl and doesn't want to married with M.R. Pawornruj at all. She is forced to move to Bangkok and is ordered to prepare herself for being a bride.

 M.L. Sineenuch Taewaprom — Pimthong Vachirakom
An only daughter of M.R. Anupan and Mom Daraneenuch Taewaprom, she was raised by spoiling from her mother. Her mother is a high-flying and punctilious person because she thinks that she is a wife of the high-rank Thai army, so she taught her daughter with the same mindset. Actually, Sineeneuch is an obedient and good-heart person but she was told since young that she is the M.R. Rachanon's fiancée. Consequently, she does everything for pull an attention from M.R. Rachanon.

 M.L., Flg.Off. Chatchavee Taewaprom / King Rangsiman — 
The stepson of M.R. Anupan, his mother was a best friend of him. He is insulted from Mom Daraneenuch because she thinks that he is a son of mistress and he received the love from M.R. Anupan more than her. Himself always thinks that his mom is a servant and has no importance. He is a fighter pilot under the Royal Thai Air Force and also the best friend of M.R. Ronapee.

His true identity is Prince Rangsiman, the son of King Suriyawong, the King of Viengbhukam. He was taken to Thailand for escaping from the rebels since very young and her mom died after that, so M.R. Anupan took him to Taewaprom for protecting him. He also has younger sister, Princess Soifah. And later he ascends to the throne of his homecountry, being King Rangsiman.

 M.R. Taewapan Taewaprom — 
He is the head of family and the owner of Taewaprom palace. He is greedy, selfish and proud of his M.R. In the past, he once safe M.C. Witchakorn Juthathep's life fron an accident, which made the both had a promise about their children marriage. Actually, he like the promise because he craves for gambling so he always taught and told his daughters about the promise and really hopes that the one of them can marry with Juthathep.

Khun Chai Taratorn 
Khun Chai Taratorn is a Thai lakorn, the first drama in the series, based on a novel series of the same name.
Its novel is wrote by Nara, the drama is produced by Maker Y Group Co., Ltd. Yossinee Na Nakorn is a producer and the director is Krit Sukramongkol. It was first aired on every Friday–Sunday, 20.15 to 22.45 (TST) since June 15 until April 5, 2013.

Synopsis 
M.R. Taratorn Juthathep, the oldest brother, takes the responsibility to take care of his younger brothers after the death of his parents. He was born from M.C. Witchakorn and M.R. Ubolwan Juthathep, the first wife. He is calm, warm and responsible person. And he is the first one who have to keep his father's promise that is marry to M.L. Kedsara Taewaprom.

M.L. Raweeramphai or Maprang, the girl who familiar with Juthathep brothers since young. She is an only child of M.C. Artittayarangsri, the archeologist and the senior of M.R. Taratorn. She secretly falls in love with M.R. Taratorn but couldn't expose her true feeling.

The love and relationship between the three, M.R. Taratorn, M.L. Raweeramphai and M.L. Kedsara have a development and meet the crossroads while they are in the middle of the brigandage of antiquities, altogether with Chinnakorn, who is Taratorn's colleague and secretly love Kedsara.

Cast

Main 
 Warintorn Panhakarn as M.R. Taratorn Juthathep / Khun Chai Yai
 Nutwinont Sutiprasit as young M.R. Taratorn
A 30-year-old Archaeology at Thai Fine Arts Department and also a history professor at the university. He is the oldest brother, the first son of M.C. Witchakorn and M.R. Ubolwan. His parents died since the five were young so he is responsible to take care of the younger brothers. He is warm-hearted, calm, sober and responsible person and has an eager to protect the national antiquities. And he is managed to marry M.L. Kedsara Taewaprom.

  as M.L. Raweeramphai Sawasward / Maprang / Tawan (disguise)
  as young M.L. Raweeramphai
She is a Journalistic college student at the same place where M.R. Taratorn is teaching, the only child of M.R. Artittayarangsri. She was born in United Kingdom and moved back to Thailand at very young age so she didn't have any friends in Thailand. M.R. Taratorn became her friend because he is familiar with M.R. Artittayarangsri, and that made her secretly felt in love with him since there. She is a bright, optimistic, honest and confident person, also she is popular in the college becaused by her a pretty face. Raweerampai interested in the Archeology, following her father's footsteps.

  as M.L. Kedsara Taewaprom / Kong Kiet (disguise)
The oldest daughter of M.R. Taewapan and being a tower of strength for her family because of her father's failure and gambling addiction. She is kind, prim, polite, truly noble-lady personality and very good at cooking desserts so she opens a Thai dessert shop in front of Taewaprom palace. Her shop is so prosperous, making enough money to support the family and every expenses. But she always wants to live and does anything like others, travelling, shopping or meeting friends.

  as Chinnakorn / Professor Chinnakorn
The special professor of archeology, M.R. Taratorn's colleague and the only child of gold shop owner. He is warm, kind, and honest person and has fallen in love with M.L. Kedssara at the first sight. After he knew that she would marry M.R. Taratorn, he try to get over her but when they became close at the field, he decided to concede his feeling.

Supporting

Juthathep family 

 Thanavat Vatthanaputi as M.R. Pawornruj Juthathep / Khun Chai Ruj
 Kantaon Luengcharoenkit as young M.R. Pawornruj
 Jirayu Tangsrisuk as M.R. Puttipat Juthathep / Khun Chai Pat
 Kornpipat Kritsanasap as young M.R. Puttipat
 Tanin Manoonsilp as M.R. Rachanon Juthathep / Khun Chai Lek
 Komkrit Sansri as young M.R. Rachanon
 James Ma as M.R. Ronapee Juthathep / Khun Chai Pee
 Anda Intarit as young M.R. Ronapee
  as Mom Aiet Juthathep Na Ayuthaya
  as Grandma Oon

Sawaswad family 
 Toon Hiranyasap as M.R. Artittayarangsri Sawaswad / Khun Chai Artit
The father of M.L. Raweeramphai. He is kind, understandable and modern person. He is the senior of M.R. Taratorn at Fine Arts Department and being respected. He is very determined to protect and inherit the national antiquities and Thai history. Also, he has a Cardiovascular disease but insists to go to archeological field for survey.

 Supranee Jaroenpol as Mom Kanlaya Sawaswad / Khun Ying Kanlaya
The mother of M.L. Raweerampai. She is kind, loves and cares about her family very much.

Taewaprom family 

  as M.R. Taewapan Taewaprom
 Chotika Wongwilas as M.L. Marathee Taewaprom
  as M.L. Wilairampa Taewaprom / Khun Rampa

Others 
  as Sir Edward Summerset
A foreigner who come to Thailand to thieve the antiquities. He disguise as the investor for a research and follows the survey team to the historic site.

 Prasart Thong-aram as Oonsri / Pran Oonsri
A hunter who works and navigates the route for M.R. Artittayarangsri's survey team.

  as Eric
The leader of the gang of thieves, hired by Sir Edward.

  as Som / Pran Som
A hunter who works with Eric.

 Chaleumpol Tikumpornteerawong as Udom
A college student who is a member of the survey team.

  as Mana
A college student who is a member of the survey team.

 Thitiphan Suriyawitch as Piti
A college student who is a member of the survey team.

  as Manit
An officer who facilitates M.R. Artittayarangsri's survey team.

 Weerachai Hatthakowit as Tan
A college student who is a member of the survey team.

 Savakorn Tiyasawaskul as Sophita
M.L. Raweerampai's friend.

 Panyaporn Srisawas as Darachai
M.L. Raweerampai's friend.

 Narisa Promsupa as Yam
M.L. Kedsara's servant and helper.

  as Thanom
Juthathep palace's chauffeur.

 Usanee Peungpa as Waew
Taewaprom palace's servant.

  as Somsri
Mom Aiet's servant.

  as Jaew
Juthathep palace's servant.

Cameo appearances 
 Songsit Roongnophakunsri as M.C. Witchakorn Juthathep / Thun Chai Wit
An only child of Mom Aiet and the father of five M.R.

 Chintara Sukapatana as Mom Ubolwan Juthathep
The first wife of M.C. Witchakorn, the mother of M.R. Taratorn and M.R. Ronapee.

 Jariya Anfone as Mom Cheongnang Juthathep Na Ayuthaya
The second wife of M.C. Witchakorn, the mother of M.R. Pawornruj.

  as Mom Yok Juthathep Na Ayuthaya
The third wife of M.C. Witchakorn, the mother of M.R. Puttipat and M.R. Rachanon. She is a daughter of the Chineses magnate.

  as Ubol
A guest in the M.R.'s coming back party at Juthathep palace, who was dancing with M.R. Rachanon.

 Prima Rachata as Dararai
Darachai's mother, make-up artist and a barber.

  as Sopee
Sophita's mother and a tailor.

  as Cha-moi
The personality specialist.

 Parin Wikran as Chinnakorn's father
  as Chinnakorn's mother

Original soundtracks

Khun Chai Pawornruj 
Khun Chai Pawornruj ( is a Thai lakorn, the second drama in the series.
Its novel is wrote by Romkaew, the drama is produced by Good Feeling Co., Ltd. Somjing Srisuparp is a producer and director. It was first aired on every Friday–Sunday, 20.15 to 22.45 (TST) since April 5 until May 3, 2013.

Synopsis 
The diplomat, M.R. Pawornruj Juthathep is a clam, kind and warm person. His job is going well and he is the only one who has the girlfriend among his brothers. He is not responsible for the promise because he is the son of M.C. Witchakorn and Mom Cheongnang, who used to be a servant of M.R. Ubolwan. That is the reason why Grandma Oon gives him love less than his brothers and always slighted carp him.

But something happened and made his girlfriend left him, he decided to go to works in Switzerland for a few months. In Switzerland, he meets M.C. Wanrasa, the princess who used to play with him at the young age, but she disguises herself as a common person which travelling there.

The love is slowly growing in the beautiful place but the end of happiness is coming, how the love is going between the one who is the son of a servant and the one who was born as princess in the luxurious palace. Moreover, what they will do if there has another person in their love life, M.L. Kratin Taewaprom

Cast

Main 
 Thanavat Vatthanaputi as M.R. Pawornruj Juthathep / Khun Chai Ruj
 Kantapon Luengcharoenkit as young M.R. Pawornruj
A diplomat who works at Ministry of Foreign Affairs as Second Secretary in Thailand, the only son of M.C. Witchakorn and Mom Cheongnang, who used to be a servant. He is calm, polite, wise and good at negotiation. Deeply in the bottom of his heart, he thinks that he is just the son of a servant, doesn't equal to his brothers, so he always does everything for his brothers. And that is the reason why Grandma Oon always nagged him a lot. He used to have a girlfriend, but later she left him without giving him any reasons, which made him decided to transfer to Switzerland.

 Nittha Jirayungyurn as M.C. Wanrasa Arunrat / Tan Ying Rasa / Tan Ying Taew / Rasa (disguise)
  as young M.C. Wanrasa
An only child of Phra Ong Chao Chatarun Arunrat and M.C. Wirisa. She is a kind, stubborn, determined and brave person. Grandma Oon once raised her when she was young and she used to play with the 5 M.R. She has a fiancé named is M.C. Phanutatsanai. She went to Switzerland for surprising her fiancé and travelling, along with her twin friends, Ueay and Aye. But she found that he cheated on her, so she decided to break the engagement.

Supporting

People around Pawornruj 

 Warintorn Panhakarn as M.R. Taratorn Juthathep / Khun Chai Yai
 Nutwinont Sutiprasit as young M.R. Taratorn
  as M.L. Raweeramphai Sawasward / Maprang
 Jirayu Tangsrisuk as M.R. Puttipat Juthathep / Khun Chai Pat
 Kornpipat Kritsanasap as young M.R. Puttipat
 Tanin Manoonsilp as M.R. Rachanon Juthathep / Khun Chai Lek
 Komkrit Sansri as young M.R. Rachanon
 James Ma as M.R. Ronapee Juthathep / Khun Chai Pee
 Anda Intarit as young M.R. Ronapee
  as Mom Aiet Juthathep Na Ayuthaya
  as Grandma Oon
 Thana Chatborirak as Pakorn
M.R. Pawornruj's best friend who lives in Switzerland.

  as Waddao
M.R. Pawornruj's ex-girlfriend and Phillip's wife.

People around Wanrasa 
  as Aye / Nhu Aye
One of M.C. Wanrasa's friends and her twin is Euay. She is bright, playful, brave, confident and straightforward. She and Ueay always encourages and supports her friend.

  as Ueay / Nhu Ueay
One of M.C. Wanrasa's friends and her twin is Aye. She is polite and not too assertive. She and Aye always encourages and supports her friend.

  as M.C. Phanutatsanai / Tan Chai Phanu
M.C. Wanrasa's fiancé. He is gallan, snappish and self-willed.

  as Phra Ong Chao Chatarun Arunrat / Phra Ong Chat
The father of M.C. Wanrasa and the owner of Arunrat palace.

 Thipaayawadee Malisorn as M.C. Wirisa Arunrat
M.C. Wanrasa's mother and died when she was young.

Taewaprom family 

  as M.L. Kratin Taewaprom
The only child of M.R. Worapan, the youngest brother of M.R. Taewapan, she was raised up in Southern Thailand because her father runs a rubber plantation. She is a native girl and doesn't want to married with M.R. Pawornruj at all. She is forced to move to Bangkok and is ordered to prepare herself for being a bride.

  as M.R. Taewapan Taewaprom / Khun Chai Taewapan
  as Mrs. Kedsara
 Chotika Wongwilas as M.L. Marathee Taewaprom
  as M.L. Wilairampa Taewaprom / Khun Rampa

Others 
  as Aun / Khun Aun
Im's older brother. He is kind and polite, a nephew of the wife of Thai Ambassador in Switzerland.

  as Im / Khun Im
Aun's younger sister. She is punctilious, cranky-mood and sarcastic, a niece of the wife of Thai Ambassador in Switzerland.

  as Saisamorn
M.C. Phanutatsanai's partner.

  as Jam
M.C. Wanrasa's wet nurse.

 Watcharakiet Boonpakdee as Warat
A clerk at Thai Embassy in Switzerland who knows the true identity of M.C. Wanrasa.

  as Ambassador Phonlathep
Thai Ambassador to Switzerland. The uncle of Aun and Im.

 Wanthana Boonbanterng as Khun Ying Aree
The wife of Ambassador Phonlathep and an aunt of Aun and Im.

  as Khae
The officer at the Ministry of Foreign Affairs.

 Witsarut Hiranbutr as Klao
M.L. Kratin's boyfriend.

  as Thanom
Juthathep palace's chauffeur.

  as Somwang
Taewaprom palace's chauffeur.

 Usanee Peungpa as Waew
Taewaprom palace's servant.

  as Somsri
Mom Aiet's servant.

  as Jaew
Juthathep palace's servant.

Cameo appearances 
 Ken Streutker as Phillip
Waddao's husband.

 Waritsara Bumrongwetch as Bua
The survant of M.C. Wanrasa.

 Kraisee Kaewwimol as Chettha
The director of the Ministry of Foreign Affairs.

  as Khun Nai Thongsuk
Grandma Oon's friend and love to gamble with her.

 Pataraphat To-in as Wet
Arunrat palace's chauffeur.

  as Som
Waddao's aunt.

 Anuwan Preeyanont as Khun Nai Sodsai
 Anthika Preeyanont as Khun Nai Ming

Original soundtracks

Khun Chai Puttipat 
Khun Chai Puttipat ( is a Thai lakorn, the third drama in the series.
It was first aired on every Friday–Sunday, 20.15 to 22.45 (TST) since May 3 until May 24, 2013.

Synopsis 
M.R. Puttipat Juthathep, the top Neurosurgeon in the country, is calm, old-fashioned and only focus on his job. He has no interest in love despite M.L. Marathee Taewaprom always try to get an interest from him and she is confident that she definitely get married with M.R. Puttipat. But, on one day, he has to go to Miss Siam contest and there, he meets the woman who shock him.

Krongkaew participated in the contest for winning the prize but she never know that the winner will become Sir Pinij's harem. She try to find a help from the people who come to witness the contest, and she found M.R. Puttipat. Many things happen afterward, the both misunderstanding and the pursuit of Sir Pinij. He wants to save her from the pursuit and follow his heart, the both decide to done marriage registration. But, because of the responsible of the promise and the difference of living, can the both make the love happen?

Cast

Main 
 Jirayu Tangsrisuk as M.R., M.D. Puttipat Juthathep / Khun Chai Pat / Khun Chai Mohr
The Neurosurgeon at the public hospital, the first son of M.C. Witchakorn with Mom Yok, a daughter of the Chinese magnate. He is calm, clever, quiet, scrupulous and has no interest about love. He is so popular for the patients and nurses at his workplace because of his good-look and smart body.

 Ranee Campen as Krongkaew Boonmee / Kaew
A diligent, grateful, innocent and beautiful person who was born in a poor family and lives with her father by themselves. She works hard to raise money for her father's surgery for a brain tumor and was persuaded to enter the Miss Siam contest for winning the prize. But she never knew that the winner will be Sir Pinij's harem.

 Chotika Wongwilas as M.L. Marathee Taewaprom
She is a snobbery, self-centered and stubborn person. She desperately wanted to be Juthathep's in-law, because she was growing up with being told from her father that she would be Juthathep's in-law in the future. So she does everything for try to get an interest from M.R. Puttipat, also being nurse and works at the same hospital with him. She never helps paying family's expenses and uses her salary for herself.

  as Sir Pinij
He is an influential and flirtatious person. He loves to lead the girls, who come from Miss Siam contest, to be his harem but he already has Khun Ying Dara as the principal wife. He tries everything to get Krongkaew as his pander.

Supporting

Juthathep family 

 Warintorn Panhakarn as M.R. Taratorn Juthathep / Khun Chai Yai
  as M.L. Raweeramphai Sawasward / Maprang
 Thanavat Vatthanaputi as M.R. Rawornruj / Khun Chai Ruj
 Nittha Jirayungyurn as Wanrasa Juthathep Na Ayutthaya / Rasa
 Tanin Manoonsilp as M.R. Rachanon Juthathep / Khun Chai Lek
 James Ma as M.R. Ronapee Juthathep / Khun Chai Pee
  as Mom Aiet Juthathep Na Ayutthaya
  as Grandma Oon

Taewaprom family 

  as M.R. Taewapan Taewaprom / Khun Chai Taewapan
  as Mrs. Kedsara / Khun Ked
She is the wife of Chinnakorn, and now living in the bridal house. She also helps Krongkaew from the pursuit of Sir Pinij.

  as M.L. Wilairampa Taewaprom / Khun Rampa

People around Krongkaew 
  as Kitti
The father of Krongkaew and he is not healthy because of the brain tumor.

  as Chinnakorn
Kedsara's husband and he help Krongkaew from the pursuit of Sir Pinij, along with his wife, at M.R. Puttipat's request.

 Narisa Promsupa as Yam
M.L. Kedsara's servant and helper.

People at the hospital 
  as M.D. Yodsavin
The Gastroenterologists who is hilarious, has a sense of humor and a gentleman. He has a crush on Krongkaew but never exposes his true feeling.

 Naruemol Phongsupharp as Nurse Piengporn

People around Pinij 
 Suangsuda Lawanprasert as Khun Ying Dara
Sir Pinij's principal wife. She is calm and courteous but she actually hurts everytime when her husband brings back harem to their home.

 Nahatai Pichitra as Aing-orn
The person in charge of finding the contestants for beauty pageant but, actually, she is a madam who leads the contestants for being Sir Pinij's pander. And she is Baibua's rival.

  as Baibua
She is a madam who find the women for being Sir Pinij's pander and she is Aing-orn's rival.

 Nattira Jivaramonaikool as Sunan
The daughter of Aing-orn. She is snobbery and overbearing but later become Sir Pinij's pander.

 Patthanapol Kunchon Na Ayutthaya as Krairerk
The son of Aing-orn and the older brother of Sunan. He is flirtatious person and used to bully Krongkaew when she lived in Aing-orn's house.

  as Mali
The staff at Miss Siam contest who tell the truth of Sir Pinij's to Krongkaew.

Others 
 Aekkarin Areerat as Sombun
Juthathep palace's servant and chauffeur.

  as Somsri
Mom Aiet's servant.

  as Jaew
Juthathep palace's servant.

Cameo appearances 
  as M.R., Maj.Gen. Anupan Taewaprom / Khun Chai Anupan
The younger brother of M.R. Taewapan, the husband of Mom Daraneenuch and the father of M.L. Sineenuch Taewaprom. And he is the stepfather of M.L., Flg.Off. Chatchavee Taewaprom.

  as M.R. Daraneenuch Taewaprom / Khun Ying Daraneenuch
The wife of M.R. Anupan and the mother of M.L. Sineenuch Taewaprom.

  as M.L., Flg.Off. Chatchavee Taewaprom
M.R. Ronapee's friend and the stepson of M.R. Anupan.

  as The Magnate Song
The Chinese magnate who is the father of Mom Yok and the grandfather of M.R. Puttipat and M.R. Rachanon. He is the owner of Yokfah Department Store.

 Prissana Klampinij as Teacher Bussaba
The teacher of Krongkaew who suggesting her to enter a beauty pageant Miss Siam.

  as Silvy
M.R. Puttipat's friend in the college years.

  as Choom
Caretaker of Juthathep family's vacation home.

 Napaporn Hongsakul as Nuan
Caretaker of Juthathep family's vacation home.

 Sutheesak Pakdeetaewa as Sir Krirk
  as Cha-moi
An MC in Sir Kirk's birthday party.

Original soundtracks

Khun Chai Rachanon

Synopsis 

The forth Juthathep who receive the pressure of responsibility, M.R. Rachanon Juthathep, the love-freedom person. He desperately want to escape from the arranged marriage with M.L. Sineenuch Taewaprom, and finally flees far away to the Northeast province. He goes to work there and accidentally meets a native girl, her name is Soifah, she is quite a rugged and stubborn girl. He has an accident, she save his life and leads him to the mysteristic village.

He have to help her out for completing the very important mission in Bangkok. Everything seems to be the big problems, making Soifah receive an acceptance from grandmothers, finding someone who will be a hero for her homecountry and helping her to hold back the throne from the tyrants. While their love is going well but suddenly, the native girl becomes the princess of neighboring countries, will their love be possible?

Cast

Main characters 
 Tanin Manoonsilp as M.R. Rachanon Juthathep / Khun Chai Lek
The fourth brother who is Civil engineer and the younger brother as the same parents with M.R.Puttipat. He is a good-natured person and really loves freedom. So when he was forced to the arranged marriage, he evaded to work in Isan. Then, he accidentally lost in the jungle, stay in Walahok village and was believed that he is The king who wears the crown of the gods following the old lady's speech. He and his brothers help Soifah seizing the throne of her country from rebellion.

 Natapohn Tameeruks as Soifah / Princess Soifah Bhukhamwong / Chao Soifah
A young girl who is naughty, brave and skilled person in the jungle because she was raised there. She is the daughter of Phoryai, the head of Walahok village. She is good at martial arts and other life skills, including foreign languages which taught by Harry. She was born in Viangbhukham, the neighbor country of Thailand, where currently was occupied by rebels and she determined to seizing the throne back.

  as Joi / Bak Joi / Sub.Lt. Chumpol Wongsawan
The close friend of Soifah since childhood. He is hilarious and isn't overthinking person. He was assigned by his father for finding the prince of Viangbhukham, who lost in Thailand many years ago, with Soifah and Chanta, for seizing the throne back from rebels.

  as Flg.Off., M.L. Chatchavee Taewaprom / Prince Rangsiman Bhukhamwong / Khun Chat
He is the stepson of M.R. Anupan Taewaprom and was told that he is the son of M.R. Anupan's best friend. He is obedient and patient even if his stepmother is bullying him because she thinks he is the son of the mistress. Later, the truth was revealed that he is the prince of Viangbhukham, who Soifah was finding.

 Pimthong Vachirakom as M.L. Sineenuch Taewaprom / Nong Nuch
A self-centered and a stubborn daughter of M.R. Anupan and Mom Daraneenuch. She want to be Juthathep's in-law following her mother's support despite her father's dissent, but she actually loves her family pretty much.

Supporting characters 

 Warintorn Panhakarn as M.R. Taratorn Juthathep / Khun Chai Yai
 Jirayu Tangsrisuk as M.R., M.D. Puttipat Juthathep / Khun Chai Pat / Khun Chai Mohr
 Ranee Campen as Krongkaew Juthathep Na Ayutthaya / Kaew
 James Ma as M.R. Ronapee Juthathep / Khun Chai Pee
  as Mom Aiet Juthathep Na Ayutthaya / Grandma Aiet
  as Grandma Oon
  as Chanta / Taraked Wongsawan
Chanta is a stepdaughter of Pran Joey who lives in Thailand, but after her father's death, she moved to live at Walahok village by accident. She is meek, obedient, grateful and good at housework, so when she living in Juthathep palace, she did everything to repay.

  as M.R., Maj.Gen. Anupan Taewaprom / Khun Chai Anupan
The younger brother of M.R. Taewapan, the husband of Mom Daraneenuch and the father of M.L. Sineenuch Taewaprom. And he is the stepfather of M.L. Chatchavee Taewaprom.

  as M.R. Daraneenuch Taewaprom / Khun Ying Daraneenuch
The wife of M.R. Anupan and the mother of M.L. Sineenuch Taewaprom. She really hates M.L. Chatchavee because has an idea that he is the son of the mistress and when she knew the truth that he is the prince, she does everything to interrupt him from accomplishing seizure the throne.

 Pongpat Wachirabunjong as Phor Yai / King Suriyawong Bhukhamwong
The head of Wilahok village who actually is the king of Viangbhukham before the rebellion. After the rebellion occur, he had to flee to Thailand and separated with his wife and son. So when he was in Thailand, he tried to find the twos and planned to seize the throne back, with the help of everyone in Walahok village.

  as Harry
The assistant of Phor Yai who acted as a teacher in Walahok village. He taught every subject especially in foreign languages.

 Sakkarach Ruekthamrong as Kraisorn / Field marshal Kraisorn Wongsawan
The assistant of Phor Yai as Harry, he was also lost his wife and daughter at the rellion incident. Actually, he is supreme Commander of Viangbhukham and a father of Chantra.

  as General officer Segeong
The head of rebel who seized the power from King Suriyawong and uses Chao Weerawong as the representative for being the new king.

  as The Magnate Song
The Chinese magnate who is the father of Mom Yok and the grandfather of M.R. Puttipat and M.R. Rachanon. He is the owner of Yokfah Department Store.

  as The old lady
She is the old lady in Walahok village who know an ancient treatment and has a sense of superstition. She is the one who tell the people about the mist which resistant danger and the future of the village.

  as Chao Weerawong
He became the representative of Segeong by force and he is unwelling to do that.

  as Ponhong
The batman who gathers many people to help the prince for seizing the throne and later became the hero of Viangbhukham.

Cameo appearances 
 Benjawan Ardner as Queen Songdao Bhukhamwong / Chao Nang Songdao
The queen of Vuangbhukham. She and the son were separated with her husband and daughter, she received helping from the old friend, M.R. Anupan. But later, she died and leaved her son with him. Her body was buried in Thailand, waiting her son bring her back to the home.

  as Boonhome
The local assistant of M.R. Rachanon, at the field when he works as engineer, before lost in the wild.

  as Pran Kern
The local people in the area where M.R. Rachanon was working, he adopted Chanta since her young.

  as Pran Joey
The local hunter that Juthathep brothers hired when they finding M.R. Rachanon in the wild

 Aekkarin Areerat as Sombun
Juthathep palace's servant and chauffeur

  as Somsri
Mom Aiet's servant

Original soundtracks

Khun Chai Ronapee 
Khun Chai Ronapee is a 2013 Thai lakorn final part of the series, directed by Chatchai Plengpanich. It aired on ThaiTV3 on Friday until Sunday at 20:15 beginning June 15, 2013 for 11 episodes. It stars James Ma and Chalida Vijitvongthong.

Synopsis 
The last one who has to be responsible about the marriage promise, M.R. Ronapee Juthathep. He is a charming and brave air force pilot and doesn't want to marry with M.L. Wilairampa Taewaprom. But on the other hand, she want to be the Juthathep's in-law so she do everything to archieve her dream. One day, M.R. Ronapee accidentally meets Piangkwan, an actress who has an accident in the drama shooting set and she falls into his arms. Ronapee interested in Piangkwan, he follow her everywhere and greets himself as a common air force pilot for testing her.

While his grandmothers always pressure him because he is the last one who can keep the promise. The brothers can feel what he is facing and try to find the ways to help him could marry with his true lover. But their grandmothers and Wilairampa don't listen to them at all and don't accept Piangkwan because of her job.

Everything seems impossible that Piangkwan found his true identity, Wilairampa won't let anyone marry him except herself and he has an accident while he's flying. But no matter what, he and she will fight together for their love along with their brothers' helps.

Main characters
 James Ma as M.R., Flg.Off. Ronapee Juthathep / Khun Chai Pee
Khun Chai Ronapee is the Royal Thai Air Force fighter pilot, is on duty at Wing 6, F-86F aircraft. His face is sharp and handsome like a real Thai man. He has a player personality as natural to any young handsome man who is endowed with complete fine qualities. He would love to flirt with any women but has a sense of obligation towards his work and responsibilities. When he is with two of his grandmothers who raised him, he tends to behave like a crybaby.

 Chalida Vijitvongthong as Piangkwan Chanpradab / Kwan
A rising star actress. Beautiful and sweet like a real Thai. Her figure and height is taller than the average Thai woman. She has a strong and persevering heart. Not weak and with her full strength and energy, she makes money to support her family.

  as M.L. Wilairampa Taewaprom / Khun Rampa
She is the youngest child of M.R. Taewapan so she has the youngest's habits. She is close with M.L. Marathee and that make the both have similar personality. She is a college student and was raised by told that she would be Juthathep's in-law. That makes her try to make M.R. Ronapee love although it's a wrong method.

  as Aut Chermsiri
The half-brother of Piangkwan and he has a crush on Junkrapoh.

 Savitree Suttichanond as Chankrapoh / Chan
Piangkwan's best friend. She is the only child of Muay Thai gym owner, Pumpui, and she follows Piangkwan to the drama shooting field for helping her like a manager.

Supporting characters

Juthathep family 

Warintorn Panhakarn as M.R. Taratorn Juthathep / Khun Chai Yai
Thanavat Vatthanaputi as M.R. Pawornruj Juthathep / Khun Chai Ruj
Jirayu Tangsrisuk as M.R. Puttipat Juthathep / Khun Chai Pat
Tanin Manoonsilp as M.R. Rachanon Juthathep / Khun Chai Lek 
 as M.L. Raweeramphai Juthathep / Maprang
Nittha Jirayungyurn as Wanrasa Juthathep Na Ayutthaya / Rasa
Ranee Campen as Krongkaew Juthathep Na Ayutthaya / Kaew
Natapohn Tameeruks as Soifah Juthathep Na Ayutthaya / Soifah
Jaruwan Panyopas as Mom Aiet Juthathep
Duangta Tungkamanee as Grandma Oon

Taewaprom family 

Dilok Thongwattana as M.R. Taewapan Taewaprom
Chotika Wongwilas as M.L. Marathee Taewaprom

People around Piangkwan 
Anuwat Niwaswong as Adul Chermsiri
Kanin Stanley as Young Adul
Aut and Piangkwan's father and the ex-husband of Napha. He is owner of a camp wood in Northern Thailand.

Khwanruedi Klom Klom as Napha Chanpradab
Piangkwan's mother

Arisara Wongchalee as Bulan Chanpradab
The younger sister of Napha, the aunt of Piangkwan and the mother of Pranod.

Pimkae Goonchorn Na Ayuthaya as Phan Chanpradab
Piangkwan's grandmother

 Tik Shiro as Chana
Piangkwan's uncle and the director of the film.

Sasidej Sasiprapha as Pranod
Piangkwan's nephew and the son of Bulan.

People in Royal Thai Air Force 
Methus Treerattanawareesin as Flg.Off. Yodyod Thongyot
M.R. Ronapee's friend at the Wing 6. He used to has a crush on Piangkwan even if he had the fiancée, later Ronapee admonished him and he went back to his fiancée.

Jakarin Puribhat as Plt.Off. Khanti
The junior of M.R. Ronapee and being in the same Wing.

Patee Sarasin as Sergeant Lamai
The aircart engineer at the Wing 6

Others 
Nitchapan Chunhawongwasu as Pimpan / Pim
Yodyod's fiancée and a friend of M.L. Wilairampa Taewaprom.

Thanongsak Supphakan as Date Kamhaeng
He has crush on Napha so far and he wants to bring Napha and Piangkwan to live with him.

Santi Santiwechakul as Sia Peng
The producer of the film that Piangkwan is starring. He is flirtatious and wants Piangkwan to be his harem.

Kanokkorn Jaicheun as Bongkot
Nuttanee Sittisamarn as Somsri
Thipharin Yodthanasawas as Jaew
Praeva Bunnag as Salakjit
Panod's friend

Palida Khumwongdee as Chailai
The friend of Pimpan and M.L Wilairampa.

--- as Adul's sister

Cameo appearances
Songsit Roongnophakunsri as M.C. Witchakorn Juthathep
Chintara Sukapatana as M.R. Ubolwan Devaprom Juthathep
Piyawadee Maleenont as Mom Yok Juthathep
Jariya Anfone as Mom Cheongnang Juthathep
Prin Suparat as Air force senior
Peradon Plengpanich as Air force pilot
Kan Phongnua as Air force pilot
Peter Varit as Pilot Air force
Chomchay Chatwilai as Madam Thongsuk
Grandma Oon's friend and love to gamble with her.

Thipparat Amattayakul as singer (ep 1)
Jaron Sorat as King Rangsiman (ep 10)
The king of Viangbhukham country and M.R. Ronapee's air force army friend.

Chalitrat Chantharubeksa as Gp.Capt., the Commander of Wing 6
Tichakorn Plengpanich as Nurse
Duangtawan Sirikon as Teacher
Sarut Wijittranon as Prince Wirawong
Aphichan Chaleumchainuwong as Sakda
M.R. Ronapee's friend and the new producer of Chana's film

Surasak Chaiyaat as Captain
Prakasit Bowsuwan as Pumpui / Punya
The father of Chankrapoh and the Muay Thai gym owner.

Sikrintarn Plaithuan as Mei Hua
Sia Peng's wife

Jaturong Kolimart as Pranod's Father

Original soundtrack

Ratings
In the tables below, the  represent the lowest ratings and the  represent the highest ratings.

Awards and nominations

References

Notes

External links 
 
 
 
 
 
 
 
 Khun Chai Ronapee at sanook! 
 Khun Chai Ronapee at K@POOK! 

Thai television soap operas
2013 Thai television series debuts
2013 Thai television series endings
2010s Thai television series
Channel 3 (Thailand) original programming